Oconee County is the westernmost county in the U.S. state of South Carolina. As of the 2020 census, the population was 78,607. Its county seat is Walhalla and its largest city is Seneca. Oconee County is included in the Seneca, SC Micropolitan Statistical Area, which is also included in the Greenville-Spartanburg-Anderson, SC Combined Statistical Area. South Carolina Highway 11, the Cherokee Foothills National Scenic Highway, begins in southern Oconee County at Interstate Highway 85 at the Georgia state line.

History
Oconee County was named after a historic Cherokee town and the word "Ae-quo-nee", meaning "land beside the water." Oconee town developed along the Tugaloo River, the border between present-day South Carolina and Georgia. The town was located along the Cherokee trading path of the early 18th century between the English colonial Atlantic port of Charleston and the Mississippi River to the west.

Oconee Town developed around an ancient platform mound built by ancestral peoples during the period of the Southern Appalachian Mississippian culture, approximately 1000CE to 1500CE. In their public architecture, the historic Cherokee built a communal town house on top of the existing earthwork mound. The town house was a meeting place for the larger community and council. Through the centuries of their long occupancy, the Cherokee would replace the town house, and maintain and add to the mound, building in distinctly colored layers of earth that are visible to archeologists.

Due to its geographic position, the town was at the intersection of the trading path and the Cherokee treaty boundary of 1777. In 1792, the newly formed South Carolina State Militia built a frontier outpost near the town site, and named it Oconee Station.

European-American settlement in this far western area of the colony did not begin until the late eighteenth century. Most did not take place until decades after the American Revolutionary War. South Carolina jurisdictions were successively called parishes, counties, judicial districts and counties again. Oconee County was not created until 1868, after the American Civil War and during the Reconstruction era. It was taken from part of the Pickens District and named after Oconee Town.

Post-Revolutionary and nineteenth-century history
 1780s - The rare American wildflower, Oconee Bell, was first recorded by French botanist André Michaux.
 1780s - Colonel Benjamin Cleveland and a group of Revolutionary veterans received land grants from the state of Georgia (which then claimed this area according to their colonial charter), in lieu of payment for service, and settled in present-day Oconee County.
 1787 - Georgia withdrew its claims to the land between the Tugaloo and Keowee rivers by the Treaty of Beaufort with South Carolina.
 1816 - Under pressure from encroaching European Americans, the Cherokee sold their remaining South Carolina land.
 1850s - The largest town in the county was Tunnel Hill, located above Stumphouse Mountain Tunnel.
 1868 - Oconee County was formed by the state legislature dividing Pickens County. Walhalla was designated as the county seat.
 1870 - Air Line Railroad built a railroad through the county; it stimulated development at stops known as Seneca and Westminster
 1893 - Newry was established as a mill village to house workers of the Courtenay Manufacturing Company, a textile mill that produced cotton, wool, and other textile products.

Geography

Three large man-made lakes provide residents with sport fishing, water skiing, and sailing as well as hydroelectric power. The largest lake is Lake Hartwell, built by the U.S. Army Corps of Engineers between 1955 and 1963. Lake Keowee is the second-largest lake and the Oconee Nuclear Station operates by the lake. Lake Jocassee is the third-largest and is a source of hydroelectric energy, but is also popular for its scenery and numerous waterfalls.

Bad Creek Reservoir, located in the mountains above Jocassee, is lso used for generating electricity during peak hours. The water level can fall by tens of feet per hour and, during off-peak times, water is pumped back into the lake for the next peak period. Because of the dramatic changes in water level due to these uses, boating and swimming are prohibited in this reservoir.

Oconee County is in the Savannah River basin.

National protected area
 Sumter National Forest (part)

State and local protected areas/sites 
 Chau Ram County Park
 Devils Fork State Park
 High Falls County Park
 Horsepasture River
 Lake Hartwell State Recreation Area
 Oconee State Park
 Oconee Station State Historic Site
 Piedmont Forestry Center
 South Cove County Park
 W.P. Anderson City Park
 Yellow Branch Falls Recreation Area

Major water bodies 
 Chattooga River
 Keowee River
 Lake Hartwell
 Lake Jocassee
 Lake Keowee
 Savannah River

Adjacent counties

 Jackson County, North Carolina - north
 Transylvania County, North Carolina - northeast
 Pickens County - east
 Anderson County - southeast
 Hart County, Georgia - south
 Franklin County, Georgia - south
 Stephens County, Georgia - southwest
 Habersham County, Georgia - west
 Rabun County, Georgia - west
 Macon County, North Carolina - northwest

Major highways

Demographics

2020 census

As of the 2020 United States census, there were 78,607 people, 31,530 households, and 21,214 families residing in the county.

2010 census
As of the 2010 United States Census, there were 74,273 people, 30,676 households, and 21,118 families living in the county. The racial makeup of the county was 87.8% white, 7.6% black or African American, 0.6% Asian, 0.2% American Indian, 2.3% from other races, and 1.6% from two or more races. Those of Hispanic or Latino origin made up 4.5% of the population. In terms of ancestry,

Of the 30,676 households, 28.2% had children under the age of 18 living with them, 53.8% were married couples living together, 11.2% had a female householder with no husband present, 31.2% were non-families, and 26.2% of all households were made up of individuals. The average household size was 2.40 and the average family size was 2.86. The median age was 43.4 years.

The median income for a household in the county was $42,266 and the median income for a family was $52,332. Males had a median income of $40,943 versus $29,841 for females. The per capita income for the county was $24,055. About 11.8% of families and 16.6% of the population were below the poverty line, including 22.7% of those under age 18 and 9.4% of those age 65 or over.

2000 census
As of the census of 2000, there were 66,215 people, 27,283 households, and 19,589 families living in the county.  The population density was 106 people per square mile (41/km2).  There were 32,383 housing units at an average density of 52 per square mile (20/km2).  The racial makeup of the county was 89.14% White, 8.38% Black or African American, 0.22% Native American, 0.35% Asian, 0.02% Pacific Islander, 1.06% from other races, and 0.82% from two or more races.  2.36% of the population were Hispanic or Latino of any race. 26.5% were of American, 13.1% Irish, 11.9% German and 10.5% English ancestry according to Census 2000.

There were 27,283 households, out of which 28.50% had children under the age of 18 living with them, 57.80% were married couples living together, 10.10% had a female householder with no husband present, and 28.20% were non-families. 24.70% of all households were made up of individuals, and 9.50% had someone living alone who was 65 years of age or older.  The average household size was 2.40 and the average family size was 2.85.

In the county, the population was spread out, with 22.90% under the age of 18, 8.00% from 18 to 24, 27.40% from 25 to 44, 26.20% from 45 to 64, and 15.60% who were 65 years of age or older.  The median age was 40 years. For every 100 females there were 96.70 males.  For every 100 females age 18 and over, there were 93.50 males.

The median income for a household in the county was $36,666, and the median income for a family was $43,047. Males had a median income of $31,032 versus $22,156 for females. The per capita income for the county was $18,965.  About 7.60% of families and 10.80% of the population were below the poverty line, including 14.00% of those under age 18 and 12.90% of those age 65 or over.

Government and politics

Communities

Cities
 Seneca (largest city)
 Walhalla (county seat)
 Westminster

Towns
 Salem
 West Union

Census-designated places

 Chickasaw Point
 Fair Play (partly in Anderson County)
 Keowee Key
 Longcreek
 Newry
 South Union
 Tamassee
 Utica

Unincorporated communities

 Corinth
 Madison
 Mountain Rest
 Oakway
 Picket Post
 Richland
 Tokeena Crossroads
 Townville (partly in Anderson County)

In popular culture
The Oconee region is mentioned in the song "Yankee Bayonet (I Will Be Home Then)" by the indie rock group the Decemberists, on their 2006 album The Crane Wife.  The reference is "When I was a girl how the hills of Oconee made a seam to hem me in."

See also
 List of counties in South Carolina
 National Register of Historic Places listings in Oconee County, South Carolina
 List of national forests of the United States
 South Carolina State Parks

References

External links

 
 

 
South Carolina placenames of Native American origin
1868 establishments in South Carolina
Populated places established in 1868
Counties of Appalachia